Boone County Airlines was a passenger airline based in Boone County, Kentucky, near Cincinnati, Ohio, USA. It was the first airline to operate commercial passenger service from the Cincinnati/Northern Kentucky International Airport instead of the Cincinnati Municipal Lunken Airport.

History 
The airline was established and started operations in 1946 and was the first airline to offer commercial passenger service from Cincinnati/Northern Kentucky International Airport. The airline operated out of the original wooden terminal built at the airport after the previously military airfield was declared surplus. The planes were crewed by members of the Boone County Aero Club. As well as passenger services, their fleet of three Douglas DC-3s were used for charter trips for businesses such as Procter & Gamble and recreational flights. Boone County Airlines also had pilot training facilities for students, while also selling airplanes and servicing aircraft. By the early 1950s, the Boone County Aero Club was dissolved and the airline had ceased operations.

Fleet 
 3 – Douglas DC-3

See also 
 List of defunct airlines of the United States

References

Airlines established in 1946
Airlines based in Kentucky
Airlines disestablished in 1950
Defunct airlines of the United States
Cincinnati/Northern Kentucky International Airport
Companies based in Boone County, Kentucky